Doug Henderson (born 1949) is an American paleoartist, illustrator and painter specializing in the portrayal of fossil animals and environments. He lives in Montana.

Henderson is best known for his renditions of prehistoric landscapes and their inhabitants, and for his "artistic" approach to paleoart through his use of light, shadow, and atmosphere. He has illustrated many books on dinosaurs and extinct life, including Dinosaurs: A Global View, Dawn of the Dinosaurs, and Maia: A Dinosaur Grows Up. Henderson played a role in the Dinosaur Renaissance with his images of dinosaurs and their environments, particularly in illustrating aspects of their behaviour not seen in more traditional restorations. In a 2015 survey of the international paleontological community, Henderson was listed as among the most recognized and influential paleoartists.

Henderson cites the dinosaur culture of the 1950s, including the 1933 movie King Kong, as some of his original inspirations for his artwork. He has worked to produce illustrations for books, museum exhibits, murals, posters, and has also done design work for movies and animation projects. He is credited as a "dinosaur specialist" on the film Jurassic Park, in which his paintings appeared.

References

External links 
 

Scientific illustrators
Paleoartists
Living people
1969 births